The Green League (vihr.), shortened to the Greens, is a green political party in Finland.

Ideologically, the Green League is positioned on the centre-left of the political spectrum. It is a reformist party and it is supportive of feminism, animal rights and green liberal ideas. Originally split on whether Finland should join the European Union, the Green League is pro-European and was the first Finnish party in favor of the federalisation of the European Union. The Green League is among the large political parties in Finland. The Greens hold twenty of the 200 seats in the Finnish Parliament and three of Finland's 14 European Parliament seats. The party is a member of the Global Greens and the European Green Party; its MEPs sit in the Greens/EFA group in the European Parliament.

Founded in 1987, the party absorbed a number of green organizations and their members, electing its first MPs in 1987. The party won ten seats in the 1991 election. Despite small losses in the in 1995 election, Pekka Haavisto joined Paavo Lipponen's first cabinet, which was composed of a rainbow coalition. This made the Green League the first green party to form part of a national cabinet. The party remained in government until 2002 when it resigned in opposition to nuclear power. The party slowly rose in popularity between 1995 and 2007, when winning a total of 15 seats, and joined the center-right-led government. In the 2011 election, the party suffered significant losses, falling to ten seats, but remained in government. In 2015, the party recovered its losses from 2011, returning to 15 seats. In the 2019 election, the party achieved by far its best-ever result, winning 20 seats and 11.5% of the vote. They became the fifth-largest party and became the third-largest member of the Social Democratic-led government.

In 2017 municipal elections the Green League was the fourth biggest party with 534 seats. They gained 211 more seats from 2012 elections.

Since June 2019, the party’s leader and chairman has been Maria Ohisalo. From 2015 to 2019, the party was in opposition, and provided harsh criticism regarding the actions of the conservative Sipilä Cabinet such as financial support for economically well-off companies, Fortum's purchase of Uniper, and the expedited process of constitution-changing surveillance laws.

History

Founding 
The Green League was founded on 28 February 1987 and was registered as a political party the next year. Political activity had begun already in the early 1980s, when environmental activists, feminists, disillusioned young politicians from the marginalized Liberal People's Party and other active groups began to campaign on green issues in Finland. In 1995, it was the first European green party to be part of a state-level cabinet.

The party was founded as a popular movement, which explains its name's descriptor liitto, "league". Initially, there was much resistance within the movement against the founding of a political party, motivated by Robert Michels' iron law of oligarchy, which claims that movements inevitably degenerate into oligarchies when they create a formal organization. The party still especially stresses openness and democratic decision-making. Even though liitto has been dropped from the party's website and advertisements, the word still remains in the official name.

Early activities (1983–1994) 
The first two parliamentary representatives were elected even before the registration, in the 1983 parliamentary election. These were the first independent representatives in the Finnish Parliament. In 1987 the number of seats rose to four, and in 1991 to ten.

About half of the party’s members were against Finland joining the European Union in 1994. Later, polls showed that most Greens were anti-Eurozone. The party heads declined to fight against euro adoption.

As part of the Lipponen Cabinets (1995–2003) 
In the 1995 election, the Green League received a total of nine seats out of 200. The party joined the coalition cabinet led by the Social Democrats, and Pekka Haavisto became the Minister of the Environment, thus becoming the first green minister in Europe.

The Green League received 7.3% of the vote, and gained two additional seats in the 1999 election, raising the total to 11. The Greens continued in the next coalition cabinet, but resigned in protest on 26 May 2002, after the cabinet's decision to allow the construction of a new nuclear plant was accepted by Parliament.

Growth to mainstream appeal (2003–present) 
In 2003, the Green League received 8.0% of the vote, receiving a total of 14 seats. They increased their seats to 15 in the 2007 election while receiving 8.5% of the vote. In the 2011 election, the party lost five seats.

In the 2009 European Parliament elections, the Greens gained two of the thirteen Finnish seats in the European Parliament, which were occupied by Satu Hassi and Heidi Hautala.

At the municipal level, the Greens are an important force in the politics of the main cities of Finland. In the municipal election of 2008 the Greens received 8.9% of the vote; the vote share was considerably higher in Helsinki, where the Greens became the second-largest party with 23.2% of the vote. In several other cities, the Greens achieved the position of the third-largest party. The Greens are weaker in rural area and especially in municipalities that experience high levels of outward migration.

By the 2017 Green League party congress, Niinistö had served three full two-year terms as the chairman and stepped down according to the rules of the party. In the following leadership election, there were six candidates running for party chair, of whom MP Touko Aalto won the election.

Soon after Aalto's election, the popularity of the Green League surged in the polls and raised briefly as the second most popular party in the country. However, in September 2017 the poll numbers turned into a downward slope, which continued until autumn 2018. After taking a month of sick leave due to exhaustion in September 2018, Aalto soon announced that he was resigning from his post, citing depression and fatigue.

In November 2018, the Green League decided to choose a temporary chairman to lead the party into the 2019 parliamentary elections and until the next party convention. In the leadership election, former chairman Pekka Haavisto was once again elected as chairman.

In June 2019, Haavisto stepped down as the chairman of the party. Maria Ohisalo was the only candidate in the leadership election and was thus elected as chairman.

Ideology and policies

The Green League is no longer a protest party, nor an alternative movement. Some Green candidates reject classifying the party as either left-wing or right-wing. Economic opinions of the members range between left and right. However, members of the party on average place their party left of the Social Democrats and right of the Left Alliance.

In the chamber of the Parliament and assembly rooms of local councils, Green representatives sit between the Finns and the Social Democrats.

The party is one of the strongest proponents for same-sex marriage. The party is also distinct in its opposition against universal male conscription and wants to opt for a gender-neutral, selective version. The eventual goal of the Greens is voluntary military service.

In 2015, the party included universal basic income (UBI) as a proposal in their platform. In February 2019, the party announced that it wanted to introduce a €300 universal basic income in the 2019 to 2023 parliamentary term, before transitioning to a €600 tax-free UBI during the following 2023 to 2027 parliamentary term.

In the spring of 2018, the party proposed lowering the voting age to 15.

The party stated in December 2018 that it supports investing €10 billion in Finland's railway infrastructure and improving rail connections in the country, including building high-speed rail connections.

In September 2021, the party voted to pass an internal motion supporting the legalisation and regulation of cannabis in Finland. It thus became the first party in Finland's Parliament to publicly state support for cannabis being legalised in the country.

Election results

Parliamentary elections

Municipal elections

European Parliament elections

Presidential elections
Parliamentarian and then-former MEP Heidi Hautala was a candidate in the presidential elections in 2000 and 2006, taking approximately a 3.5% share of votes in the first round in each. Pekka Haavisto was the first Green candidate in the 2012 election to enter the second round. Haavisto got an 18.8% share of votes in the first round, and lost to centre-right Sauli Niinistö in the second round held on 5 February.

Politicians

List of party chairs

Current members of Parliament
The following 20 Greens politicians were elected to the Finnish Parliament in the 2019 parliamentary election. 16 out of 20 members are first-timers. 17 of the members are women.

Current members of the European Parliament
Since 2020, the Green League has been represented by three MEPs in the European Parliament.

See also 

Green politics
Politics of Finland
List of environmental organizations
Pentti Linkola
Kirjava ”Puolue” – Elonkehän Puolesta
Universal basic income in the Nordic countries

References

External links
Official site 

Green League
Political parties supporting universal basic income
1987 establishments in Finland